Graziosi is a surname. Notable people with the surname include:
 Barbara Graziosi, Italian classicist
 Giuseppe Graziosi (1879–1942), Italian painter, sculptor, and engraver
 Franco Graziosi (born 1929), Italian actor
 Paolo Graziosi (born 1940), Italian actor